ZanAir Limited is a domestic airline based in Zanzibar, Tanzania; it was founded in 1992 in Zanzibar.

History
ZanAir was established in 1992 by Carl G. Salisbury, who believed there was a market to be explored regarding the tourism industry of Zanzibar and the Tanzania region. 

The first flight of ZanAir occurred on May 4, 1991, when Carl G. Salisbury landed on Zanzibar with a Piper Seneca II.

Destinations

Scheduled flights are operated to the following destinations:

Fleet

As of September 2022, all of the aircraft currently in ZanAir's fleet have expired their CoAs, and haven't been renewed as of yet. The ZanAir fleet consists of the following aircraft:

References

External links
Official website

Airlines of Tanzania
Transport in Zanzibar
Airlines established in 1992
1992 establishments in Tanzania